Seal Island, Seal Islands and similar may refer to:

Places

Africa 
Seal Island, South Africa, known for predation by great white sharks on the Cape Fur Seal
Seal Island, one of the Bird Islands in Algoa Bay, South Africa 
Seal Island, Namibia, in Lüderitz Bay

Antarctica 
Seal Islands (South Shetland Islands)

Australia

South Australia 
Seal Island (Encounter Bay), part of the West Island Conservation Park
Seal Island (Investigator Strait), part of the Althorpe Islands Conservation Park

Tasmania 
Prime Seal Island, Tasmania

Western Australia 
 Seal Island (Albany, Western Australia), in the Great Southern region
 Seal Island (St Alouarn Islands), in the South West region
 Seal Island (Houtman Abrolhos), in Houtman Abrolhos chain
 Seal Island (Ravensthorpe, Western Australia), in Great Southern region
 Seal Island (Shoalwater, Western Australia), in the Shoalwater Islands Marine Park

Victoria
 Seal Island (Victoria), off Wilsons Promontory
 Seal Rocks (Victoria), off Phillip Island

Europe 
Seal Island is a local name for the largest of The Carracks, a small group of islands off Cornwall, United Kingdom

North America 
Machias Seal Island, in disputed waters in the Gulf of Maine near the US–Canada border

Canada 
 Seal Island (Nova Scotia), off the southwestern tip of Cape Sable Island
 Seal Island Bridge, connecting Boularderie Island with Cape Breton Island in Nova Scotia, Canada

Caribbean 
 Seal Island, Anguilla, in the Seal island Reef System Marine Park

United States 
Seal Island Historic District, on the islands of St. George and St. Paul in the Bering Sea of Alaska
Seal Islands (Aleutians East), in the Bering Sea, close to Bristol Bay, Alaska, U.S.
Seal Islands (California), a pair of islands in Suisun Bay at the mouth of the Sacramento-San Joaquin River Delta

Seal Island National Wildlife Refuge, an island off the coast of the U.S. state of Maine

Media 
Seal Island (film) (1948), directed by James Algar and produced by Walt Disney

See also 
 East Seal Dog Island, an uninhabited islet of the British Virgin Islands
 Little Seal Dog Island or West Seal Dog Island, an uninhabited islet of the British Virgin Islands
 Ile des Phoques, an island off Tasmania
 Robben Island, an island in Table Bay, off South Africa
 Seal Bay (disambiguation)
 Seal Rock (disambiguation)